Luna Bergere Leopold (October 8, 1915 – February 23, 2006) was a leading U.S. geomorphologist and hydrologist, and son of Aldo Leopold. He received a B.S. in civil engineering from the University of Wisconsin in 1936; an M.S. in physics-meteorology from the University of California, Los Angeles in 1944; and a Ph.D. in geology from Harvard University in 1950.

Leopold is widely known in his primary field for his work in fluvial geomorphology and for the classic book, Fluvial Processes in Geomorphology, that he wrote with Gordon Wolman and John Miller.

Leopold suggested that a new philosophy of water management is needed, one based on geologic, geographic, and climatic factors as well as traditional economic, social, and political factors. He argued that the management of water resources cannot be successful as long as it is naïvely perceived from an economic and political standpoint, as it is in the status quo.

Career
From 1937 to 1940, Leopold worked as an engineer for the U.S. Soil Conservation Service in New Mexico. In 1940, he enlisted and was a part of the U.S. Army Weather Service and the  Army Air Force. He was in the Army until 1946 and he rose from the rank of Private to Captain.

From 1946 to 1950, Leopold served as the Chief Meteorologist of the Pineapple Research Institute, Hawaii. In 1950, he joined the U.S. Geological Survey. He worked for the USGS until 1972 serving as Hydraulic Engineer (1950–56), Chief Hydrologist (1956–66), and Senior Research Hydrologist (1966–72).

In 1972, Leopold joined the faculty of the University of California, Berkeley as a professor in the Department of Geology and Geophysics and Department of Landscape Architecture. He retired in 1986 and continued as a Professor Emeritus until his death in 2006.

Awards and honors
1958 - Recipient of the first Kirk Bryan Award of the Geological Society of America (with Thomas J. Maddock, Jr.)
1967 - Elected to the United States National Academy of Sciences
1968 - Recipient of the Cullum Geographical Medal of the American Geographical Society
1971 - Elected to the American Academy of Arts and Sciences
1972 - President of The Geological Society of America
1972 - Elected to the American Philosophical Society
1973 - Recipient of the G. K. Warren Prize from the National Academy of Sciences.
1980 - Honorary Doctorate from the University of Wisconsin
1981 - Honorary Doctorate from the University of St. Andrews, Scotland
1988 - Honorary Doctorate from the University of Murcia
1991 - Awarded the National Medal of Science.
1992 - Awarded the Robert E. Horton Medal
1994 - Awarded the Penrose Medal
1994 - Awarded the Joan Hodges Queneau Palladium Medal
2006 - Awarded The Benjamin Franklin Medal in Earth Science

Books by Luna Leopold
Leopold, Luna B. (1966). Water (Series: LIFE Science Library), Time Incorp, ISBN B000GQO9SM.
Leopold, Aldo and Leopold, Luna B. (editor) (1972, reprint). Round River. Oxford University Press, USA. .
Leopold, Luna B. (1974). Water: A Primer. W H Freeman & Co. .
Dunne, Thomas and Luna B. Leopold (1978). Water in Environmental  Planning. W. H. Freeman & Co. .
Leopold, Luna B. (1966, reprinted 1981). Water, Life Science Library, Time Life Education. .
Leopold, Luna B.; Wolman, M. Gordon; and Miller, John P. (1995). Fluvial Processes in Geomorphology. Dover Publications. .
Leopold, Luna B. (1997). Water, Rivers and Creeks. University Science Books. .
Leopold, Luna B. (2006, reprint). A View of the River. Harvard University Press; New Ed edition. .

References

Other sources
The San Francisco Chronicle, 3/3/2006
New York Times, 3/20/2006
The Virtual Luna Leopold Project
Association of Engineering Societies website

1915 births
2006 deaths
20th-century American geologists
American hydrologists
American people of German descent
American geomorphologists
Members of the United States National Academy of Sciences
National Medal of Science laureates
Penrose Medal winners
People from Albuquerque, New Mexico
Process geomorphologists
Recipients of the Cullum Geographical Medal
Sedimentologists
United States Geological Survey personnel
University of California, Berkeley faculty
University of Wisconsin–Madison College of Engineering alumni
Harvard University alumni
University of California, Los Angeles alumni
Presidents of the Geological Society of America
Members of the American Philosophical Society